The progesterone receptor A (PR-A) is one of three known isoforms of the progesterone receptor (PR), the main biological target of the endogenous progestogen sex hormone progesterone. The other isoforms of the PR include the PR-B and PR-C.

See also
 Membrane progesterone receptor

References

Intracellular receptors
Progestogens
Transcription factors